Pusiola squamosa is a moth in the subfamily Arctiinae. It was described by George Thomas Bethune-Baker in 1911. It is found in Cameroon.

References

Natural History Museum Lepidoptera generic names catalog

Endemic fauna of Cameroon
Moths described in 1911
Lithosiini
Moths of Africa